Robert Joseph Smith (born August 20, 1937 - October 24, 2020) was an American professional basketball player and coach.

A 6'4" guard from West Virginia University, Smith was drafted by the Minneapolis Lakers in the third round of the 1959 NBA Draft and appeared in 13 games with the Lakers over two seasons. He scored 37 points in his career.  Smith was head coach for the men's varsity basketball at George C. Marshall High School during the 1960s.   Smith returned to West Virginia University (WVU) to serve as assistant coach from 1978 to 1985. He was inducted into the WVU Sports Hall of Fame in 2009.

References

1937 births
2020 deaths
American men's basketball players
Basketball players from West Virginia
Guards (basketball)
Los Angeles Lakers players
Minneapolis Lakers draft picks
Minneapolis Lakers players
West Virginia Mountaineers men's basketball players